(O pleasing melody), BWV 210.1 (formerly ), is a secular cantata by Johann Sebastian Bach for a solo soprano. Bach wrote it in Leipzig as a "Huldigungskantate" (homage cantata) for Christian, Duke of Saxe-Weissenfels. First performed on 12 January 1729, the cantata became part of his repertory of congratulatory and homage cantatas, dedicated at least twice to different people and occasions. Bach used it as the base for his wedding cantata .

History and words 
Bach first performed  cantata in 1729 and adapted it for two other occasions. The first version, performed on 12 January 1729, paid homage to Christian, Duke of Saxe-Weissenfels on the occasion of his visit to Leipzig.

Only the soprano part and a separate printed textbook of the earliest version survived into the twentieth century. The soprano part was lost in World War II. Bach used the five arias, the first recitative and the beginning of the last recitative later in his wedding cantata , therefore the music can be reconstructed. Alexander Ferdinand Grychtolik edited a reconstruction, published by Edition Güntersberg. He chose the third text version as the most general one.

Scoring, structure and music 
The cantata in ten movements is probably scored as the surviving , for soprano, flauto traverso, oboe d'amore, two violins, viola, and basso continuo with violone and harpsichord.

 Recitative: 
 Aria: 
 Recitative: 
 Aria: 
 Recitative: 
 Aria: 
 Recitative: 
 Aria: 
 Recitative: 
 Aria: 

Richard D. P. Jones notes in his book The Creative Development of Johann Sebastian Bach that the text deals with the power of music, inspiring Bach to music of "quite exceptional quality".

References

External links 
 
 
 Cantata BWV 210a O angenehme Melodei: history, scoring, sources for text and music, translations to various languages, discography, discussion, Bach Cantatas Website
 BWV 210a – "O angenehme Melodei!": English translation, discussion, Emmanuel Music
 BWV 210a O angenehme Melodei!: English translation, University of Vermont
 BWV 210a O angenehme Melodei!: text, scoring, University of Alberta

Secular cantatas by Johann Sebastian Bach
1729 compositions